Appleton City is a city in St. Clair County, Missouri, United States. The population was 1,032 as of the 2020 census. It is the largest city in St. Clair County.

History
Appleton City was originally called Arlington, and under the latter name was platted in 1870. The present name is after D.S. Appleton (1824-1890) of the D. Appleton & Company, who contributed a $500 library to the city. 

The Hudson City School was listed on the National Register of Historic Places in 2002.

Geography
Appleton City is located at  (38.189953, -94.028642).

Climate

Demographics

2010 census
As of the census of 2010, there were 1,127 people, 501 households, and 281 families residing in the city. The racial makeup of the city was 96.8% White, 0.6% African American, 0.5% Native American, 0.1% from other races, and 2.0% from two or more races. Hispanic or Latino of any race were 0.7% of the population.

There were 501 households, of which 26.3% had children under the age of 18 living with them, 44.1% were married couples living together, 9.2% had a female householder with no husband present, 2.8% had a male householder with no wife present, and 43.9% were non-families. 40.5% of all households were made up of individuals, and 24.6% had someone living alone who was 65 years of age or older. The average household size was 2.16 and the average family size was 2.91.

The median age in the city was 45.2 years. 21.2% of residents were under the age of 18; 7.6% were between the ages of 18 and 24; 21.1% were from 25 to 44; 24.1% were from 45 to 64; and 26% were 65 years of age or older. The gender makeup of the city was 47.6% male and 52.4% female.

2000 census
As of the census of 2000, there were 1,314 people, 552 households, and 342 families residing in the city. The population density was 1,147.0 people per square mile (441.2/km2). There were 635 housing units at an average density of 554.3 per square mile (213.2/km2). The racial makeup of the city was 98.17% White, 0.08% Native American, 0.38% from other races, and 1.37% from two or more races. Hispanic or Latino of any race were 0.46% of the population.

There were 552 households, out of which 28.1% had children under the age of 18 living with them, 48.4% were married couples living together, 10.1% had a female householder with no husband present, and 38.0% were non-families. 36.1% of all households were made up of individuals, and 23.0% had someone living alone who was 65 years of age or older. The average household size was 2.25 and the average family size was 2.89.

In the city the population was spread out, with 25.1% under the age of 18, 5.9% from 18 to 24, 22.3% from 25 to 44, 19.3% from 45 to 64, and 27.5% who were 65 years of age or older. The median age was 43 years. For every 100 females there were 82.8 males. For every 100 females age 18 and over, there were 71.4 males.

The median income for a household in the city was $23,674, and the median income for a family was $30,365. Males had a median income of $25,000 versus $18,864 for females. The per capita income for the city was $12,566. About 16.5% of families and 23.1% of the population were below the poverty line, including 32.4% of those under age 18 and 18.9% of those age 65 or over.

Education
Appleton City R-II School District operates one elementary school and Appleton City High School.

The town has a public library, the Appleton City Library.

Notable people
Edward A. Babler, doctor and humanitarian after whom Babler State Park was named
John Baldwin, Missouri state senator
Byron Calame, editor for The Wall Street Journal and The New York Times 
Ivah Wills Coburn, stage actress
Daniel Cowan Jackling, mining and metallurgical engineer who pioneered the use of low-grade porphyry copper ores at the Bingham Canyon Mine, Utah.
Vester Pegg, silent film actor

References

External links

 
 Historic maps of Appleton City in the Sanborn Maps of Missouri Collection at the University of Missouri

Cities in Missouri
Cities in St. Clair County, Missouri
Populated places established in 1870
1870 establishments in Missouri